Echo is an unincorporated community located in Metcalfe County, Kentucky, United States. Echo was originally established as Seventy Seven in 1891, then changed to Echo in 1894. A post office with service to Knob Lick, Metcalfe County, Kentucky in 1914.

References

Unincorporated communities in Metcalfe County, Kentucky
Unincorporated communities in Kentucky